Aquilinus may refer to the following people:

 Aquilinus, a pagan commander confronted by Pancras of Taormina (died c. 40 AD)
 Aquilinus of Milan or Aquilinus of Cologne (died 1015), martyr
 Aquilinus of Évreux (c. 620–695), Frankish bishop and hermit
 Aquilinus, sometime Bishop of Colonia Agrippina before 248 AD
 Aquilinus (589–599), sometime Bishop of Vic
 Aquilinus (c. 430-c. 470), a nobleman of Lyon, father of St Viventiolus and St Rusticus
 Titus Herminius Aquilinus (died 498 BC), a hero of the Roman Republic
 Lucius Titius Epidius Aquilinus, consul in 125 AD
 Lucius Titius Plautius Aquilinus, consul in 162 AD, probably his son
 Lars Herminius Aquilinus, Roman consul in 448 BC